James J. Mooney (July 8, 1930 – October 29, 2015) was an American professional basketball player. He set Villanova's still-standing sophomore year rebounding record with 455.

Mooney signed with the Philadelphia Warriors during the 1952–53 NBA season and made his debut on February 8, 1953. In 18 career games, he averaged 7.5 points, 3.9 rebounds, and 1.9 assists per game. Mooney, Villanova's team captain, signed with the Warriors after being declared ineligible to continue playing for Villanova in early February 1953. He would play the remainder of the season before joining the United States Marine Corps.

References

1930 births
2015 deaths
American men's basketball players
Philadelphia Warriors players
Small forwards
Undrafted National Basketball Association players
Villanova Wildcats men's basketball players
Basketball players from Philadelphia